13th Regiment or 13th Infantry Regiment may refer to:

 13th Parachute Dragoon Regiment, a unit of the French Special Forces
 Somerset Light Infantry (13th Regiment of Foot), a unit of the British Army
 13th Infantry Regiment (Greece)
 13th Infantry Regiment (Philippine Army), a unit of the Philippine Army
 13th Cavalry Regiment (United States), a unit of the United States Army
 13th Infantry Regiment (United States), a unit of the United States Army
 13th Infantry Regiment (Imperial Japanese Army), a unit of the Imperial Japanese Army

 American Revolutionary War regiments 
 13th Continental Regiment
 13th Massachusetts Regiment
 13th Pennsylvania Regiment
 13th Virginia Regiment

 American Civil War regiments 

 Union (Northern) Army

 13th Illinois Volunteer Infantry Regiment
 13th Iowa Volunteer Infantry Regiment
 13th Maine Volunteer Infantry Regiment
 13th Regiment Massachusetts Volunteer Infantry
 13th Michigan Volunteer Infantry Regiment
 13th Regiment Illinois Volunteer Cavalry
 13th West Virginia Volunteer Infantry Regiment
 13th Wisconsin Volunteer Infantry Regiment

See also

 13th Army (Soviet Union)
 13th Division (disambiguation)
 13th Brigade (disambiguation)
 13th Group (disambiguation)
 13th Battalion (disambiguation)
 13 Squadron (disambiguation)